Events from the year 2009 in Indonesia

Incumbents

Events

 100% Cinta Indonesia
 2009 Pendet controversy
 Bloom Agro is founded.
 January 4: 2009 Papua earthquakes 
 January 11: The MV Teratai Prima sunk.
 February 11: 2009 Talaud Islands earthquake 
 March 27: due to a dam failure the Situ Gintung lake is drained.
 April 9: Indonesian legislative election, 2009
 April 17: Mimika Air Flight 514 
 May 20: 2009 Indonesian Air Force C-130H Hercules crash
 June 5: Miss Indonesia 2009 
 July 8: Indonesian presidential election, 2009 
 July 17: 2009 Jakarta bombings
 August 2: Merpati Nusantara Airlines Flight 9760
 September 2: 2009 West Java earthquake 
 September 30: 2009 Sumatra earthquakes 
 October 8: 2009 Sulawesi superbolide
 October 9: Puteri Indonesia 2009 
 November 22: Dumai Express 10

Television debuts

 Angel's Diary
 Bayu Cinta Luna
 Cinderella (Apakah Cinta Hanyalah Mimpi?)
 Safa dan Marwah

Sport

 2009 Indonesia national football team results
 2008–09 Indonesia Super League
 2008–09 Liga Indonesia Premier Division 
 2009 Copa Indonesia Final
 2009 Commonwealth Bank Tournament of Champions
 2009 Asian Archery Championships
 2009 FIBA Asia Champions Cup
 2009 Asian Cycling Championships
 2009 Indonesia Super Series
 Indonesia at the 2009 Asian Indoor Games
 Indonesia at the 2009 Southeast Asian Games
 Indonesia at the 2009 World Championships in Athletics
 Indonesia at the 2009 Asian Youth Games

 
Indonesia